Indiatimes Shopping was the ecommerce division of The Times of India Group, India's largest media conglomerate. It is one of the pioneers in electronic commerce in India and services its customers through various channels including online and selling over the phone. It also provided platform services for brands to go online and sell their products in partnership through White-label. Some of the major categories sold through Indiatimes Shopping included men & women footwear, apparel & accessories, lifestyle, home décor, mobile phones, consumer electronics, health & personal beauty products, books, jewellery, baby products and flowers & gifts. Indiatimes Shopping operated through a hybrid model which is a mix of warehousing and marketplace.

Business model
Indiatimes Shopping initiated its operation in the year 2000, being one of the earliest e-commerce companies in India. It has various business models.

E-tailing
Indiatimes Shopping sold a range of products online including footwear, apparel, mobile phones, consumer electronics, computers & accessories, flowers & gifts, home décor items, books and a lot more. Customers had the option of paying through credit card, debit card, netbanking and cash on delivery.

Key people
Gautam Sinha is the Chief Operating Officer of Times Internet Limited. Saurabh Malik is the Business Head of Indiatimes Shopping, Amit Bhatia is Head of Marketing and Vivek Pandey heads Product and Technology.

Location
The company's headquarters is located in Gurgaon's Udyog Vihar area near Delhi-Gurgaon highway. It has offices and customer service centers across India, including Noida, Jaipur, Bangalore, Mumbai and Delhi. Indiatimes Shopping's warehouses are located in Daryaganj and Dwarka, Delhi.

Indiatimes Shopping uses in-house ecommerce technology platform that can handle complex e-commerce execution requirements related to Business, Logistics, Finance, Marketing & Content.

mCommerce
The mobile app of shopping.indiatimes.com was officially launched in the year 2012 on Android and iOS. The mobile version of the site was launched in October 2014.

See also
 Ecommerce in India
 Online shopping

References

 "Cash-on-delivery hurts bottom line of cos like Flipkart, Snapdeal due to extra associated costs". The Economic Times. Retrieved 2013-11-04.
 "Beware! Fakes, grey market imports of reputed brands flourishing in India’s booming online retail market". The Times of India. Retrieved 2014-10-14.
 "Shoppers log on to comparison portals for picking up best deals." Retrieved 2014-20-10.

External links

Online retailers of India
Privately held companies of India
The Times Group
Retail companies established in 2012
2012 establishments in Maharashtra

ta:பிளிப்கார்ட்